South Richmond is an area within the city of Richmond in the U.S. state of Virginia. It is on the south side of the James River, across from Richmond's downtown.

References

Neighborhoods in Richmond, Virginia
Populated places on the James River (Virginia)